Jusup Wilkosz (8 November 1948 – 19 November 2019) was a German bodybuilder. He competed in weightlifting before turning to bodybuilding. In the mid-1970s, Wilkosz trained with Arnold Schwarzenegger.

Several injuries forced him to end his career before reaching his potential peak. In 1994 Jusup Wilkosz intended to prepare for the Mr. Olympia Masters, but was stopped by injuries again.

In spring 2007, a semi-fictional novel about Wilkosz's life was published in Germany with the title Was bleibt. Die Reise des Jusup W. (English "What remains: The Journey of Jusup W."). It leads the reader back to the 1970s and 1980s, a time often considered the golden age of bodybuilding.

Stats
Height: 6 ft 0 in
Weight: 253 lb

Titles
1979 German Bodybuilding Championships - 1st
1979 World Amateur Championships - 1st
1979 IFBB Mr. Universe - 1st
1980 IFBB Pro Mr. Universe - 1st
1981 Mr. Olympia - 6th
1982 Mr. Olympia - 10th
1983 Mr. Olympia - 6th
1983 Grand Prix Switzerland - 4th
1983 Grand Prix Sweden - 3rd
1983 Grand Prix World - 3rd
1984 Mr. Olympia - 3rd
1986 Mr. Olympia - 12th

Videos
 "Der Wille, die Kraft, der Sieg" - a workout video

Books
"Was bleibt - Die Reise des Jusup W." by Heiger Ostertag

See also 
List of male professional bodybuilders
List of female professional bodybuilders

External links
 Short profile of Wilkosz with pictures

1948 births
2019 deaths
German bodybuilders
Professional bodybuilders
Sportspeople from Heilbronn